Sterling Moss McMurrin (January 12, 1914 – April 6, 1996) was a liberal Mormon theologian and Philosophy professor at the University of Utah. He served as United States Commissioner of Education in the administration of President John F. Kennedy.

Biography

Born in Woods Cross, Utah, McMurrin's family moved to Los Angeles, California in the 1920s while he was at a young age.  There he attended high school and the University of California at Los Angeles (UCLA), but he gained his A.B. in history and M.A. in philosophy from the University of Utah.  Returning to California for doctoral studies, the University of Southern California awarded him a Ph.D. in philosophy in 1946.  McMurrin also did postdoctoral studies at Columbia University, Princeton University, and Union Theological Seminary.  For a time McMurrin worked for the LDS Church Educational System, first as a seminary teacher in 1937, then a teacher at Arizona State University, and Institute of Religion director at the University of Arizona.

Regarding his religion, McMurrin argued that the LDS Church concealed parts of its history and had been declining in intellectual freedom.  He believed that an honest study of religion would erode faith, and he personally did not believe in the historicity of the Book of Mormon.  However, he remained devoted to Mormonism, despite his lack of faith and criticism from more "orthodox" church members. In the early 1950s, Joseph Fielding Smith and Harold B. Lee believed McMurrin should be excommunicated. David O. McKay met with McMurrin and agreed to testify on McMurrin's behalf, but the apostles did not pursue the excommunication. Joseph Fielding Smith suggested again that McMurrin be excommunicated in 1965, but McKay declined to take action.

In McMurrin's noted career, he worked with universities, large corporations, foundations, and governmental agencies, as a teacher, an administrator, and an advisor.

Works

Edited volumes

Chapters and articles

References

Sources

Further reading

External links
Biographical Sketch, Inventory of the Sterling M. McMurrin papers (1830-2006), University of Utah
"Inventory of Sterling McMurrin Papers at John F. Kennedy Presidential Library"
McMurrin Interviews, Symposium Media: Interviews, Lectures, and Panel Discussions

1914 births
1996 deaths
20th-century American writers
Academics from Utah
American Christian theologians
American Latter Day Saints
People from Davis County, Utah
Philosophy academics
United States Bureau of Education people
University of Southern California alumni
University of Utah alumni
University of Utah faculty
Mormon theologians